Erik Johan Gustaf af Klint (11 December 1816 – 20 July 1866) was a Swedish naval officer who also served in the Austrian Navy, reaching the rank of captain in the 1860s. He commanded the Austrian steam frigate  at the Battle of Lissa on 20 July 1866, where he was killed in action.

Notes

References

1816 births
1866 deaths
Austro-Hungarian Navy officers
Austro-Hungarian military personnel killed in action
People who died at sea
People from Gotland